In enzymology, a tRNA (guanine-N2-)-methyltransferase is an enzyme that catalyzes the chemical reaction

S-adenosyl-L-methionine + tRNA  S-adenosyl-L-homocysteine + tRNA containing N2-methylguanine

Thus, the two substrates of this enzyme are S-adenosyl methionine and tRNA, whereas its two products are S-adenosylhomocysteine and tRNA containing N2-Methylguanine.

This enzyme belongs to the family of transferases, specifically those transferring one-carbon group methyltransferases.  The systematic name of this enzyme class is S-adenosyl-L-methionine:tRNA (guanine-N2-)-methyltransferase. Other names in common use include transfer ribonucleate guanine 2-methyltransferase, transfer ribonucleate guanine N2-methyltransferase, transfer RNA guanine 2-methyltransferase, guanine-N2-methylase, and S-adenosyl-L-methionine:tRNA (guanine-2-N-)-methyltransferase.

Structural studies

References

 
 
 
 
 
 
 
 

EC 2.1.1
Enzymes of known structure